Monte Senario is a Servite monastery in the comune of Vaglia, near Florence in Tuscany, in central Italy. It stands on the mountain of the same name, on the watershed between the Valdarno to the south and the Mugello to the north. It was established in 1245 by the seven founding members of the Servite order and was the first Servite monastery.

References

Servite monasteries in Italy